The State Protection Group (SPG) is part of the Counter Terrorism & Special Tactics Command of the New South Wales Police Force and was established in 1991 to deal with extraordinary policing responses. The SPG directly supports police in high-risk incidents such as sieges with specialised tactical, negotiation, intelligence and command-support services. The unit also provides rescue and bomb disposal support, canine policing, and armoury services.

History
Established in June 1991, the State Protection Group replaced four former specialist units; the Special Weapons and Operations Section (SWOS), the Witness Security Unit, regional Tactical Response Groups and the Police Rescue Squad.
Later other sections were also added to the command including the Police Armoury, Negotiation section, Bomb disposal and Dog Unit. In recent years the Witness Security Unit was moved from the State Protection Group to the Anti Terrorism & Security Group.

Roles
 Resolving siege and hostage situations, as well as armed offender situations;
 Providing a negotiation service in high risk and critical situations;
 Undertaking searches of premises in high risk situations;
 The arrest of armed and dangerous offenders;
 Escorting and securing dangerous prisoners in high risk situations;
 Providing support services for major operations;
 Rescue and bomb disposal operations;
 Counter-terrorism and hijacking operations;
 The escort and security of VIPs, internationally protected persons, Heads of State; and
 Providing specialist engineering services and supply of ammunition and firearms for the NSW Police Force through the Armoury.

Mission
"To provide extraordinary services to operational police in rescue, bomb disposal, high risk resolution, negotiation, specialised dog unit and Armoury services."

Organisation
The SPG currently consists of the following sections:

Tactical Operations Unit (TOU)
Tactical Operations Regional Support (TORS)
Negotiation Unit
Intelligence Unit
Police Rescue and Bomb Disposal Unit
Dog Unit

Tactical Operations Unit (TOU)

Since 1978, the Australian Government's National Counter-Terrorism Plan has required each state police force to maintain a specialist counter-terrorist and hostage-rescue unit (Police Tactical Group, aka police tactical unit). The unit that now fulfills that role, the Tactical Operations Unit, has undergone a number of changes over the years.

Since 1945 the New South Wales Police Force has maintained a team of tactical police available for specialist operations with the creation of the 'Riot Squad' which consisted of a number detectives from '21 Division' to counter the number of armed hold ups that occurred after World War II. Over the following years it became known as the 'Emergency Squad' and in 1977 had its name changed to the 'Special Weapons and Operations Section' (SWOS) with its size and role expanding, including a full-time complement of 27 officers and 400 part-time officers across the State.

In 1980 the Tactical Response Group (TRG) was created, becoming operational in May 1982, with units divided into groups of 25 officers across the four metropolitan regions with a primary role of responding to riots, demonstrations, disasters, saturation patrols and to support SWOS at emergency hostage/siege situations. TRG officers were mainly drawn from the ranks of general duties police whereas SWOS were drawn from Detectives sections and branches.

In June 1991 both units were rationalised and dissolved with the creation of the Tactical Operations Unit with the aim of resolving high-risk incidents by containment and negotiation, with minimal or judicious use of force to be applied only as a last resort and based on full and careful assessment. Unlike the former SWOS and TRG, the TOU is a completely full-time assignment with a strength of 75 officers and is not responsible for riot control or crowd control situations, which are handled by the Public Order and Riot Squad (PORS). The TOU is available to provide extraordinary assistance to operational police in high-risk incidents such as resolving siege and hostage situations, as well as armed offender situations across the State on a 24-hour basis. The TOU also conducts 'high risk' arrest operations of armed and dangerous offenders such as Ivan Milat, Malcolm Naden, or those involved in firearm incidents such as bikie related shootings. The TOU deals with at least 200 "high-risk" situations, including siege and hostage scenarios, each year across NSW.

The TOU is equipped with 'less-lethal' devices as well as specialist firearms and equipment for 'domestic' and counter-terrorist operations. Members of the TOU are equipped with a wide range of specialist firearms including Heckler & Koch UMP submachine guns and tactical shotguns. The TOU is equipped with a wide range of specialist vehicles including mobile command/support vehicles, armoured Chevrolet vans and three Lenco BearCat armoured Ford F550s.

As stated earlier the Tactical Operations Unit does have a wider range of firearms and tactical equipment to choose from. The standard sidearm is the Glock Model 22 (Glock 22) .40 S&W pistol usually carried in a Safariland 6280 Holster that can accept the Glock with a tactical light attached. The main rifle used is the SIG MCX chambered in .300 AAC Blackout replacing the previously issued Colt M4 Carbine chambered in 5.56×45mm. Rifles are fitted with optical sights, fore-grip, flashlights, laser sights and an adjustable stock. Snipers use a variety of rifles and have been seen using the Accuracy International Arctic Warfare as the sniper rifle of choice along with the LaRue Tactical OBR 7.62 marksman rifle.

The TOU feature in an in-depth article of 'On Duty' magazine detailing selection criteria and fitness requirements amongst other operational facets. In 2020 TOU featured in volume 12 of international tactical photography magazine "FLASHBANG Magazine".

Tactical Operations Regional Support (TORS)
New South Wales has maintained a part-time tactical capability across the State under various names over the years. Through the 1960s and 1970s the units were known as Emergency Squads becoming known as Country/Regional SWOS in the late 1970s and early 1980s. With the creation of the Tactical Operations Unit in 1991 and dropping of the name SWOS the units became known as State Protection Support Unit (SPSU).

 2018, the SPSU was renamed to Tactical Operations Regional Support (TORS).

TORS provides specialist support to the Tactical Operations Unit in resolving high-risk incidents in regional New South Wales. The various TORS Units across the State are involved in approximately 60 'high risk' operations per year.

Comprising part-time tactical operatives from non-metropolitan areas, TORS consists of police whose primary duties cover a wide range of activities including general duties, highway patrol, detectives and weapons training.

The types of operations that they can be called upon to undertake include containing siege and armed offender situations; resolving siege and hostage situations; arresting armed and dangerous offenders, often in high-risk situations; conducting high-risk searches of premises; escorting and providing security for internationally protected persons, heads of State and holders of high office who are assessed and determined to be at risk. The unit also provides support services for high-risk major operations.

Each year TORS is involved in approximately 60 operations across the State which includes pre-planned operations and the execution of high-risk search warrants. While primarily a regional resource, TORS can be deployed throughout the State to assist the Tactical Operations Unit.

Approximately 170 TORS officers are on call across the state under regional command.

The TOU is responsible for the initial selection and training of TORS volunteers, followed up by monthly local training and an annual TOU re-certification camp. TORS officers also attend various training camps organised by Tactical Operations Unit to maintain consistency in their training levels.

TORS teams are equipped with a range of specialist tactical gear including less than lethal munitions such as Tasers, beanbags as well as various shotguns and M4/M16 Assault rifles.

The range of skills TORS operators possess include bushcraft and navigation, close quarter tactics, entry methods, ballistic shield operations, cordon and perimeter operations, advanced weapons training, and less than lethal tactics.

Negotiation Unit
In 1979 the NSW Police ran their first Hostage Negotiator Unit course forming a part-time on call unit. In 1991 with the creation of the SPG the term hostage was dropped due to the variety of call-outs the unit was used for and a small full-time cadre established.

At present under the supervision of a small full-time cadre, highly trained negotiators are on call across the state on a part-time, as-needed basis. Negotiators work hand in hand with other units of the State Protection Group in order to resolve incidents peacefully.

Roles and tasks
Suicide intervention
Persons with mental health issues
Kidnapping/extortion
Sieges/hostage situations
Barricaded offender situations
Escapees
Warrants – search, high-risk warrant execution
Family law matters
Public order management
National counter-terrorism incidents

Intelligence Unit

This unit provides intelligence information to negotiators and other TOU officers involved in high-risk incidents. Such intelligence may include information on people involved (offenders, hostages or suspects), or the provision of plans and photographs of premises.

Police Rescue and Bomb Disposal Unit

Originally created in 1942 as the Police Cliff Rescue Squad for the express purpose of recovering the bodies of suicide victims, or rescuing persons trapped on cliffs, the Police Rescue and Bomb Disposal Unit has undergone numerous changes and expansions over the years. Apart from responding to 000 (emergency calls) calls, the Police Rescue Unit provides specialist search and rescue support of operational police in situations of any risk category. This support extends from searches for evidence, to working with negotiators at extreme heights.

Police Rescue operators are trained to use equipment such as Jaws of Life, metal detectors, trapped person locaters, sophisticated communication equipment and cutting tools etc. These officers are experts in abseiling, climbing, single rope techniques and stretcher escorts with cliff machines.

The Units core responsibilities include:
 General Rescue,
 Specialist Support,
 Land Search and Rescue
 Bomb Response and Disposal.

Some of the Rescue Unit's responsibilities and challenges include:
 Rescuing people trapped in difficult high or deep places such as mines, storm-water drains, cliffs, scaffolding and remote places.
 Rescuing people involved in industrial, traffic, railway and aircraft accidents or who may have become trapped in household equipment, machinery or playground equipment.
 Providing power or lighting in emergencies or for police operations
 Rescuing livestock and animals in accidents
 Working in toxic or hazardous environments

In 1993 the Department of Defence handed over bomb disposal responsibilities to the NSW Police Force. The Bomb Disposal section was established within Forensic Services and then in 1997, the section was relocated to the SPG. Prior to the 2000 Sydney Olympic Games, the Bomb Disposal section was amalgamated with the Rescue Unit.

The Police Rescue and Bomb Disposal Unit is based in Alexandria (Sydney). Decentralized units are based in the Blue Mountains, Newcastle, Goulburn, Bathurst, Lismore and Oak Flats (formerly Wollongong). The mostly part-time decentralized units are responsible for rescue and bomb appraisal operations within their local area and provide specialist support tasks for operational policing that cannot be provided by other units or sections. Established in 2015, the newly formed Western Region Police Rescue Squad comprising general duty officers from Moree, Narrabri, Tamworth, Quirindi, Werris Creek, Armidale and Bourke provides specialist operational support to various police units across the Western Region.

The unit was the subject of an Australian ABC television series (1991–1996) and a 1994 feature film, Police Rescue.

The Police Rescue and Bomb Disposal Unit celebrated its 75-year anniversary in 2017 with the Blue Mountains Police Rescue Squad its 50th anniversary in 2018.

Rescue Squad Major Involvements
It is estimated that the unit has attended over 300,000 jobs in the past 60 years. The Unit has been involved in some of the States, and Australias, largest incidents including the following:

 1966 Wanda Beach Murders
 1974 Cyclone Tracy
 1977 Granville rail disaster
 1978 Sydney Hilton bombing
 1979 Sydney Ghost Train fire
 1989 Newcastle earthquake
 1989 Kempsey bus crash
 1997 Thredbo landslide
 1999 Glenbrook rail accident
 2003 Waterfall train disaster
 2007 Sydney Harbour ferry/pleasure cruiser crash
 2008 Sydney Harbour boat collision
 2009 British backpacker Jamie Neale search
 2011 Mosman collar bomb incident
 2011 Parramatta Bomb Hoax/Hostage Incident
 2013 New South Wales bushfires
 2014 Sydney Lindt Cafe Hostage Incident.

Dog Unit
More commonly referred to as the 'Dog Squad', the Police Dog Unit was initially created in NSW between 1932 and 1953 and was reintroduced in 1979.

The unit was established to support police in locating offenders and missing persons, detecting and detaining fleeing criminals and detecting drugs, firearms and explosives Dogs used for patrol duties are German Shepherds or Rottweilers. The Labrador Retriever is the breed of choice for specialist detection for narcotics and explosives, etc.

The Unit employs both male and female handlers, most of whom work two dogs. After training, all police dog teams are able to track and find wanted offenders or missing persons, search all types of buildings, detect illicit drugs, and support foot-patrolling of public places to deter crime and make these places safer for the community. The Dog Unit is the largest Dog Unit of any Police Force in Australia and provides specialist dogs for operations 24 hours a day, seven days a week across the State.  The Dog Unit has teams based around the State with its main base at Menai and sections at Tweed Heads, Wagga Wagga and Dubbo.

As of July 2020 the NSWPF Dog Unit is the largest police dog unit in Australia with more than 100 police officers, eight civilian staff and more than 100 police dogs.

Dog Squad officers may be called upon to chase and apprehend offenders who may be escaping arrest and may be armed and dangerous or act as a deterrent and back up in dangerous situations such as brawls, sieges, riots and domestics. They are also used to provide high-profile foot patrols in places such as schools, industrial areas, shopping complexes and during large public events such as New Year's Eve or sporting events, etc.

The Dog Unit currently has the following capabilities/specialist dogs:

 general purpose and
 tactical dogs (who work closely with the TOU)
public order
 drug detection
 firearms, explosives detection
 cadaver detection
 currency detection
Urban search and rescue (USAR)

NSW Police Force general purpose and tactical dogs are also issued their own sets of canine body armour/ballistic vests.

The Dog Squad has been involved in numerous high-profile arrests since its creation including the arrest of Australias "most wanted man", Malcolm Naden as part of "Strike Force Durkin".

See also

NSW Police Force units
 Public Order and Riot Squad (NSW Police riot unit)

Australian tactical units
 Police Tactical Groups
 Tactical Assault Groups (Australian Defence Force)

International tactical units
 Police tactical unit
 List of police tactical units

Related articles
 National Counter-Terrorism Exercise

References

External links

New South Wales Police official website

New South Wales Police Force
Police units of Australia
1991 establishments in Australia